The Lunsemfwa River is a tributary of the Luangwa Rivers in Zambia and part of the Zambezi River basin. It is a popular river for fishing, containing large populations of tigerfish and bream.

It is used to generate hydroelectric power for the Kabwe mines through the Mita Hills Dam, built in the 1950s with a reservoir about 30 km long by 3–5 km wide, and another power station at Lunsemfwa Falls.

About 30 km below the dam it enters a remote and inaccessible gorge which it has cut back into the plateau from the edge of the Luangwa Rift Valley into which it flows. Known as the Lunsemfwa Wonder Gorge it is 20 km long, up to 500 m deep and about 1 km wide at the top.

A viewpoint called Bell Point overlooks the confluence of the Lunsemfwa and its tributary the Mkushi River, about 15 km along the gorge, and can be reached on a dirt track.

The Lunsemfwa enters the Luangwa Rift valley about 40 km from its western end, where the valley is about 45 km wide. It flows to the middle of the valley and turns east as a meandering river with oxbow lakes and a floodplain 1–2 km wide. 100 km further on it merges with the Lukusashi coming from the north-east, and the combined river turns south towards the Luangwa River.

Location

References 

 Google Earth accessed 18 February 2007.
 Camerapix: Spectrum Guide to Zambia, Camerapix International Publishing, Nairobi, 1996.
 Terracarta: Zambia, 2nd edition, International Travel Maps, Vancouver, Canada, 2000.

 
Rivers of Zambia
Geography of Central Province, Zambia